The 1996 Cal State Northridge Matadors football team represented California State University, Northridge as a member of the Big Sky Conference during the 1996 NCAA Division I-AA football season. Cal State Northridge and Sacramento State competed for the first time in the Big Sky Conference in 1996. Both teams has been members of the American West Conference (AWC), which folded after the 1995 season. Led by Dave Baldwin in his second and final season as head coach, Cal State Northridge compiled an overall record of 7–4 with a mark of 4–3 in conference play, tying for third place in the Big Sky. The team outscored its opponents 407 to 313 for the season. The Matadors played home games at North Campus Stadium in Northridge, California.

Schedule

References

Cal State Northridge
Cal State Northridge Matadors football seasons
Cal State Northridge Matadors football